Kier may refer to:

 Kier (industrial), a type of boiler or vat
 Kier Group, a business active in building and civil engineering
 Kier Eagan, the fictional founder of Lumon Industries in the Apple TV series Severance

People with the surname
 Lemont Kier, an American chemist and pharmacologist
 Samuel Kier, an American inventor and businessman
 Udo Kier, a German actor